Fitzgerald Field House is a 4,122-seat multi-purpose athletic venue on the campus of the University of Pittsburgh in Pittsburgh, Pennsylvania, United States. Fitzgerald Field House is named for Rufus Fitzgerald, a past chancellor (1945–1955) of the university. It is the primary home competition venue for the university's gymnastics, volleyball, and wrestling teams.

Usage

Fitzgerald Field House is the competitive venue for the Pitt varsity sports of volleyball, gymnastics, and wrestling. With an indoor track, the Field House also serves as the primary indoor facility for the university's track and field team, as well as housing the wrestling training facility and the primary training and weight facilities for Pitt's Olympic sports. In addition, it contains the offices and locker rooms for baseball, cross country, soccer, softball, swimming and diving, and tennis. The facility also has squash courts. The Field House is connected by a tunnel to Trees Pool  and the Gymnastics Training Center, both located in Trees Hall.

Built in 1951, Fitzgerald Field House was, for five decades, the home of  Pitt's basketball program. The Field House provided a home court advantage that allowed the program to achieve a 414-175 (.703) record while utilizing the facility. It also served as the home basketball court of Pitt's intracity rival, the Duquesne University Dukes, from 1956-57 to 1963-64. From 1984 until 2002, the Pitt men's basketball team also played selected Big East Conference and non-conference games at the Civic Arena. Pitt's women's basketball team also used the Field House as their primary home court. Both the men's and women's Pitt basketball teams moved to the Petersen Events Center in 2002.

In 1999, Fitzgerald Field House underwent $3.8 million ($ million today) in renovations of existing facilities and a major addition to the west side of the building for locker rooms, team dressing rooms, and training and equipment rooms.  In the summer of 2005, the wrestling training facility built in 1951 was reconstructed to be twice the size of the previous training facility and also  received new floor and wall mats, a new ventilation system, new lighting, a video and recruitment room, and a balcony suspended above the mats featuring cardio equipment.  In addition, an Olympic sports weight room was added to serve as a primary training facility for over 300 Pitt student-athletes and includes Hammer Strength and Nautilus Next Generation machines, nearly 8,600 pounds of free weights, and a comprehensive cardiovascular unit, including treadmills, stationary bikes and the Stairmaster Gauntlet. The renovations and addition of the weight room reduced the seating capacity from its prior 6,798 seats to a capacity of 4,122.

Further renovations of the Field House in 2008 totaled $1.4 million ($ million today) and included new volleyball courts and installation of seating and electronic equipment to meet NCAA requirements. In November, 2011, the Nathan Hershey Athletic Training Facility was dedicated in the Field House.

Notable events

 1957 NCAA Wrestling Championship
 1962 Speech delivered by President John F. Kennedy
 1963 NCAA Men's Gymnastics Championship
 1979 Eastern AIAW Volleyball Championship
 January 25, 1988 – In one of the most famous events in college basketball history, Pitt's Jerome Lane shatters the backboard with a slam dunk during the Panthers' game against Providence. The incident is equally memorable for Bill Raftery's broadcast call of "Send it in, Jerome!"
 1998 NCAA Gymnastics Northeast Regional Championship
 2005 Senior Olympics (basketball and shuffleboard)
 3  East Atlantic Gymnastics League Championships (2000, 2004, 2012)
 4 Eastern Wrestling League Championships (1979, 1992, 2000, 2008)
 12 Big East Volleyball Championships (1986, 1988, 1991, 1992, 1996, 1998, 1999, 2001, 2002, 2004, 2008, 2010)
2021 NCAA Women’s Volleyball Regional semifinal and Final.

References

External links
Fitzgerald Field House on Pitt's virtual Campus Tour
Fitzgerald Field House facility tour at PittsburghPanthers.com
Pitt Gymnastics
Pitt Volleyball
Pitt Wrestling
Remember Fitzgerald Field House

Pittsburgh Panthers basketball venues
University of Pittsburgh buildings
Defunct college basketball venues in the United States
Athletics (track and field) venues in Pennsylvania
Basketball venues in Pittsburgh
College indoor track and field venues in the United States
College gymnastics venues in the United States
College volleyball venues in the United States
College wrestling venues in the United States
Indoor track and field venues in the United States
Pittsburgh Panthers sports venues
Pittsburgh Panthers wrestling
Sports venues in Pittsburgh
Volleyball venues in the United States
Wrestling venues in Pennsylvania
Sports venues completed in 1951
1951 establishments in Pennsylvania